The 2022 Dalian Professional F.C. season was the 13th season in club history.

Overview

Preseason 
On 16 February, the team regrouped for winter training. Sun Wei, Zhou Ting and Liu Yujian served as temporary managers.

On 12 March, Dalian Pro announced major changes in its owners. Wanda Group decided to quit, and the team would be taken over temporarily by a government-led reforming work team. Past debts and operating costs of the first team, youth training facilities and projects for the next three years would still be covered by Wanda Group through a sponsor contract. The Dalian Pro Academy Base was donated to DETA Holdings (Chinese:德泰控股), a state-invested company in Dalian. After the announcement, Dalian Pro publicly recruited for head coaches and professional players.

On 19 March, Xie Hui was announced the team's new manager.

As Wanda quit the club's operation, Dalian Pro further tightened their expenses by cutting players' salaries. Due to this issue, Zhao Xuri, Zheng Long and Tao Qianglong left the team on free transfer, while Li Shuai and Sun Bo terminated their contracts through CFA arbitrations. On the other hand, Dalian Pro signed multiple free, experienced players for replenishment, many of which were born in Dalian. Until 5 May when player registration was submitted, Larsson, Danielson and Boateng were not in squad, indicating that domestic players would be the only choice of Dalian for the first few rounds of the 2022 season.

In May, it was reported that Dalian Pro U-21 team would compete separately as Dalian Jinshiwan F.C. The team was able to participate in the 2022 Chinese Champions League through qualification rounds. Liu Yujian remained as the head coach, while Zhou Ting was registered as both player and coach of the team.

On 24 May, Chongqing Liangjiang Athletic announced their end of operation. On 26 May, it was reported that Dalian Pro's back into the 2022 Chinese Super League was approved. Dalian Pro would replace Chongqing, to play in Haikou, Hainan.

June 
Though being considered the team with the most relegation possibility for lack of foreign players and CLO-level transfers, Dalian Pro gained much appreciation through their first few matches for Xie Hui's aggressive formation and pressing tactics. The team were able to suppress teams with 4 foreign players with fully-domestic startup, which was considered almost impossible in the past few seasons. Newly joined elder players like Yan Xianghcuang, Fei Yu and Shang Yin had above-expectation performances. However, a mistake in player substitution occurred during the match against Guangzhou City, leading to a 47-second match time without U-23 players for Dalian Pro, which flawed the almost-perfect league start. The opponent submitted complaint case to the CFA after the match. While Dalian Pro claimed that Shan Huanhuan's injury during the U-23 national team callup allowed them to neglect the U-23 rule, their 2–0 victory was finally re-judged to a 0–3 defeat.

July-Interval 1 
For the first time since 2020, the second stage of the 2022 CSL would return to its normal Home-Away fixtures, instead of closed-door matches held in a selected city. Dalian Pro temporarily relocated their home stadium to Puwan Stadium (普湾体育场), a newly built stadium, while Shanghai Port and Shanghai Shenhua would use Dalian Sports Center and Jinzhou Stadium as their temporary home stadium due to special pandemic regulations in Shanghai.

Two foreign players trained with the team during the interval, Borislav Tsonev and Streli Mamba.

August 
On 18 August, Dalian Pro announced the withdrawn of their transfer ban. On 21 August, 2 foreign players and 4 domestic players joined the team. Also, Dalian Pro extended the contract with Xie Hui for 3 years. By the end of mid-season transfer window, the team signed two more foreign players Manzoki and Bosančić to strengthen the squad.

Dalian Jinshiwan ranked 1st in the 2022 CMCL group K, and further qualified into the CMCL finals. Li Jiahao scored 6 goals to won the best goal scorer in group k.

September 
Tsonev scored his debut goal against Mezhou Hakka. He had goals in all of his first 4 matches.

On 1 September, the team won Shenzhen by 5-1, to become the largest win in team history, comparing to the 5–2 victory against Shandong Luneng in 2012 (round 18).

According to the team, Manzoki and Bosancic arrived in China on 30 August and 4 September, respectively.

Due to regional COVID restrictions in Dalian, rounds 16 through 20 were postponed.

Since the middle of September, a few players of the same agent including Lin Liangming, Tong Lei, Wu Wei, and Shan Huanhuan, were reported to have contract disputes with the club. They were removed from the starting lineups. As reported, the team would like to further reduce salaries with these players, which was the major cause of this dispute. By the end of the month, Lin Liangming, ranking as the team's top goal scorer at the time, reached consensus with the team, but the other three players were still absent from the squad.

The team had some difficulties switching to new formations with new players. Bosancic had partial Achilles tendon rupture in his second match, and would be absent for quite a few months.

October 
Round 23 to 25 were postponed due to multiple concerns regarding the 20th National Congress of the CCP.

In the October 31 match against Wuhan Yangtze River, Dalian Pro were awarded the first penalty kick in this season.

As of the end of October, the team acquired 25 points, and constantly maintained a pleasant 10-point gap above the relegation zone.

November
After acquiring a winning from Hebei, Dalian Pro maintained a 21-point gap above the relegation zone (36 points vs 15 points at the time). With 6 matches to play, Dalian Pro were safe from relegation. After the key victory, it was reported that Mamba and Manzoki returned home.

December
As for the 9 Dec victory from Shanghai Shenhua, Dalian Pro remained undefeated for 7 matches, and had a 4-match winning streak, which the team had never experienced in the Chinese Super League. Previously in the 2012 season, Dalian was undefeated for 6 matches, while the longest super league winning streak was 3 matches (2012, 2013, 2018, 2019).

Dalian Pro reported physical issues of multiple players, and promoted 7 players from U-19 team temporarily before the match against Wuhan Yangtze River.

The CFA declared Tianjin JM Tiger to lose for the Dec. 27 match, as Tianjin were unable to play due to COVID infections.

Squad

First team squad

Coaching staff

Transfers

Pre-season

In

Out

Mid-season

In

Out

Friendlies 
Preseason

Interval

Chinese Super League

Standings

League table

Results summary

Positions by round

Fixtures and results 
Some matches were postponed due to temporary COVID restrictions, and were recorded by actual order, while their original rounds were tagged afterwards with brackets.

Stage 1-Group B (Haikou Stadia)

Stage 2

Chinese FA Cup

FA Cup fixtures and results

Squad statistics

Appearances and goals

Goalscorers

Disciplinary record

Injuries

Suspensions

References 

Dalian Professional F.C. seasons
Dalian Professional F.C.